The  Blackwater Bossing season was the seventh season of the franchise in the Philippine Basketball Association (PBA).

Key dates
March 14: The PBA Season 46 draft was held at the TV5 Media Center in Mandaluyong.

Draft picks

Roster

Philippine Cup

Eliminations

Standings

Game log

|-bgcolor=ffcccc
| 1
| July 16
| Alaska
| L 77–103
| Simon Enciso (23)
| Kelly Nabong (9)
| Amer, Enciso, Magat (3)
| Ynares Sports Arena
| 0–1
|-bgcolor=ffcccc
| 2
| July 18
| Rain or Shine
| L 62–71
| Kelly Nabong (18)
| Marion Magat (10)
| Simon Enciso (3)
| Ynares Sports Arena
| 0–2
|-bgcolor=ffcccc
| 3
| July 23
| Barangay Ginebra
| L 81–96
| Mike Tolomia (22)
| Kelly Nabong (7)
| Simon Enciso (5)
| Ynares Sports Arena
| 0–3
|-bgcolor=ffcccc
| 4
| July 28
| San Miguel
| L 80–99
| Simon Enciso (25)
| David Semerad (8)
| Mike Tolomia (6)
| Ynares Sports Arena
| 0–4

|-bgcolor=ffcccc
| 5
| September 1
| TNT
| L 76–96
| Simon Enciso (14)
| Kelly Nabong (12)
| Mike Tolomia (6)
| DHVSU Gym
| 0–5
|-bgcolor=ffcccc
| 6
| September 3
| Magnolia
| L 78–94
| Kelly Nabong (19)
| Kelly Nabong (14)
| Simon Enciso (5)
| DHVSU Gym
| 0–6
|-bgcolor=ffcccc
| 7
| September 5
| Terrafirma
| L 84–96
| Mike Tolomia (14)
| Kelly Nabong (8)
| Mike Tolomia (5)
| DHVSU Gym
| 0–7
|-bgcolor=ffcccc
| 8
| September 9
| NorthPort
| L 73–98
| Frank Golla (14)
| Frank Golla (7)
| Simon Enciso (7)
| DHVSU Gym
| 0–8
|-bgcolor=ffcccc
| 9
| September 11
| Phoenix
| L 92–114
| Mike Tolomia (23)
| Ed Daquioag (7)
| Ed Daquioag (5)
| DHVSU Gym
| 0–9
|-bgcolor=ffcccc
| 10
| September 16
| NLEX
| L 73–90
| Simon Enciso (17)
| Marion Magat (7)
| Simon Enciso (7)
| DHVSU Gym
| 0–10
|-bgcolor=ffcccc
| 11
| September 18
| Meralco
| L 97–104
| Canaleta, Escoto, Tolomia (15)
| Mike Tolomia (8)
| Enciso, Tolomia (4)
| DHVSU Gym
| 0–11

Governors' Cup

Eliminations

Standings

Game log

|-bgcolor=ffcccc
| 1
| December 9
| Rain or Shine
| L 79–92
| Rashawn McCarthy (15)
| Bond, Eboña (11)
| Baser Amer (7) 
| Ynares Sports Arena
| 0–1
|-bgcolor=ffcccc
| 2
| December 11
| Phoenix
| L 99–110
| Jaylen Bond (18)
| Jaylen Bond (15)
| Rashawn McCarthy (7) 
| Ynares Sports Arena
| 0–2
|-bgcolor=ffcccc
| 3
| December 16
| Meralco
| L 77–98
| Rashawn McCarthy (19)
| Jaylen Bond (15)
| Rashawn McCarthy (3) 
| Smart Araneta Coliseum
| 0–3
|-bgcolor=ffcccc
| 4
| December 18
| San Miguel
| L 88–107
| Paul Desiderio (16)
| Jaylen Bond (17)
| Ed Daquioag (6)
| Smart Araneta Coliseum
| 0–4
|-bgcolor=ffcccc
| 5
| December 22
| Alaska
| L 75–98
| Rashawn McCarthy (16)
| Richard Escoto (7)
| Baser Amer (6)
| Smart Araneta Coliseum
| 0–5

|-bgcolor=ffcccc
| 6
| February 12, 2022
| Terrafirma
| L 103–109
| Shawn Glover (35)
| Shawn Glover (17)
| JVee Casio (5)
| Smart Araneta Coliseum
| 0–6
|-bgcolor=ffcccc
| 7
| February 18, 2022
| NLEX
| L 97–117
| Shawn Glover (39)
| Shawn Glover (15)
| Ayonayon, Casio (5)
| Smart Araneta Coliseum
| 0–7
|-bgcolor=ffcccc
| 8
| February 25, 2022
| Barangay Ginebra
| L 100–109
| Shawn Glover (29)
| Shawn Glover (6)
| JVee Casio (6)
| Ynares Center
| 0–8

|-bgcolor=ffcccc
| 9
| March 2, 2022
| NorthPort
| L 103–116
| Shawn Glover (47)
| Shawn Glover (12)
| JVee Casio (8)
| Smart Araneta Coliseum
| 0–9
|-bgcolor=ffcccc
| 10
| March 4, 2022
| TNT
| L 93–106
| Shawn Glover (26)
| Shawn Glover (15)
| Shawn Glover (9)
| Smart Araneta Coliseum
| 0–10
|-bgcolor=ccffcc
| 11
| March 9, 2022
| Magnolia
| W 101–100
| Shawn Glover (33)
| Shawn Glover (9)
| Shawn Glover (7)
| Smart Araneta Coliseum
| 1–10

Transactions

Free agency

Signings

Trades

Pre-season

Philippine Cup

Mid-season

Governors' Cup

Recruited imports

References

Blackwater Bossing seasons
Blackwater Bossing